Veronica Eriksson, born Martin Eriksson (15 June 1971) is a retired Swedish pole vaulter. She was born in Stockholm.

Her personal best jump was 5.80 metres, achieved in March 2000 in Pietersburg. This places her fourth on the Swedish all-time list, behind Armand Duplantis, Oscar Janson and Patrik Kristiansson and equal to Alhaji Jeng.

In February 2020, Eriksson told about her undergone hormone treatment, facial surgery, legal gender reassignment and name change to Veronica.

Achievements

References

1971 births
Living people
Swedish male pole vaulters
Athletes (track and field) at the 2000 Summer Olympics
Olympic athletes of Sweden
Athletes from Stockholm
Competitors at the 1999 Summer Universiade